Loram may refer to:

 Mark Loram, a speedway racer
 Lorazepam, a drug
 Loram Maintenance of Way, a railroad track maintenance company